Filip Filipov (born 31 January 1971), is a former Bulgarian football defender.

Club career
Filipov began his career at the local "Sliven". His first spell at PFC CSKA Sofia spanned one season (1990–91), after which he moved to Lokomotiv GO, and then played a short time for Jeju United of South Korean K League, then known as Yukong Elephant and Bucheon SK, only to return to PFC CSKA Sofia for another year. He then spent some time playing in LEKS (Litex) before again returning to PFC CSKA Sofia for a third spell since December 1997.

Coaching career
In 2007 became coach of the youth national team in 17 years, subsequently he was coach of FC Vihren Sandanski from November 2007 to September 2009, with some interruptions - especially memorable 2-1 victory over Litex in 2007/08gl. 1-0 against PFC Levski Sofia and Lokomotiv Sofia, 3-1 as the guest of PSFC Chernomorets Burgas 2008/09g season. Despite these victories the team finished in 14th place in the standings and was relegated to the "B" group. After a hesitant start in the Western "B" group in September Filipov was fired from FC Vihren Sandanski. A month later he became coach of Kaliakra Kavarna in the East "B" group, led the team to first place, which automatically qualified them in the "A" group. In the same season Kaliakra Kavarna reached the 1/2 finals of the Cup of Bulgaria, prevailing over Lokomotiv Plovdiv, PFC Marek Dupnitsa, PFC Cherno More Varna before being eliminated on penalties by PFC Chernomorets Pomorie. The first season of "A" group in the history of Kaliakra Kavarna began with a shock victory away to PFC Slavia Sofia 1-0, but after a few poor results Filipov was fired. In October 2011 he was invited by Dimitar Penev as assistant coach at the headquarters of CSKA Sofia.

Honours

Player
  CSKA Sofia
Bulgarian League Winner: 1
 1996-97 A PFG
Bulgarian League Runners-up: 2
 1990-91 A PFG:: 1993-94 A PFG
Bulgarian Cup Winner: 1
 1996-97 Bulgarian Cup
  Jeju United FC
League Cup Runners-up: 2
 1998 Adidas Cup
 1998 Philip Morris Korea Cup

Manager
  Kaliakra Kavarna
Bulgarian Second League Winner: 1
 2009–10 B PFG
Bulgarian Cup Semifinalist: 1
 2009–10 Bulgarian Cup

References

External links
 
 

Living people
1971 births
Bulgarian footballers
Bulgaria international footballers
PFC CSKA Sofia players
PFC Cherno More Varna players
FC Lokomotiv Gorna Oryahovitsa players
Jeju United FC players
PFC Litex Lovech players
Antalyaspor footballers
PFC Slavia Sofia players
PFC Marek Dupnitsa players
First Professional Football League (Bulgaria) players
K League 1 players
Süper Lig players
Association football defenders
Bulgarian football managers
Bulgarian expatriate footballers
Expatriate footballers in South Korea
Bulgarian expatriate sportspeople in South Korea
Expatriate footballers in Turkey
Bulgarian expatriate sportspeople in Turkey